Cheongna Dalton School (CDS) is a secular international private college preparatory school situated in Cheongna, Incheon, South Korea, offering an American curriculum following the Dalton Plan in an English-only setting.

Cheongna Dalton School opened to students on September 1, 2011, and has classes from pre-Kindergarten to the 12th grade.

The present site is 46,200 m2 (11.4 acres or 497.292 sq ft) and is located in the Cheongna area.

The school provides dormitory and day-school options but the elementary students cannot use the dorms. They share the philosophy of Dalton School in New York and accept the Dalton Plan that Helen Parkhurst established during her career. They have accreditation from WASC and the school provides AP system classes.

The Western Association of Schools and Colleges (WASC), based in California, accredited Cheongna Dalton School for a six-year term on July 2, 2012. As a condition of attending the school, a student is required to have at least one parent who holds a foreign passport, or the student must have been out of the country of Korea for more than 1,095 days at the time of enrollment.

Campus and facilities 

The school has computers for student use, and all classrooms and facilities are fully networked. There are two libraries and several science laboratories. The auditorium, known as the Dalton Hall, is used for parent and teacher functions, fine arts productions and concerts, and it is equipped with lighting and sound systems. Music facilities include orchestra and choir rooms and sound-proofed practice rooms.
Athletic facilities include a gymnasium, an equestrian course with four horses, a tennis court, a heated swimming pool, a soccer field with grass turf, and a dance room.

At the entrance of the school, there is a golden statue of Founder of Bongduk Education Foundation, Madame Bongduk Lee (1921~2010).
The campus consists of the High School block, the Middle School Block, the "First Program" (Elementary), soccer field and residential facilities include the dormitory for students, and the Town House and Guesthouse for foreign teachers.

Courses

Students in the school must attend Korean classes, World Language classes and extracurricular activities. In Middle School, basic subjects such as Pre-Algebra, Algebra 1 geometry, social studies, science and physical education. In High School, there are more extracurricular activities such as band. Counseling sessions are offered for students, AP Courses and college counseling sessions are offered for High School students, so that they can find a suitable college to attend after graduating.

In CDS, there is a team championship known as the Dalton Cup, where students in different Dalton Cup teams compete in many subjects, such as sports, music, Accelerated Reader programs, writing competitions, and math competitions. Teams who achieve the highest score achieves the Dalton Cup trophy. 

Daily schedules are oriented according to the three principles of the Dalton Plan : House, Laboratory and Assignment. House is a session in the morning where students gather in their homeroom classes, and listen to announcements, upcoming events and reminders. The Laboratory, known as Lab Time, is a 30-minute session after first period, where students can visit teachers for assignments or talk with friends. There is also a period known as Silent Sustained Reading, or SSR, in which students must read a book silently for a duration of 30 minutes. 

The school follows the six principles known as the 6Cs: Character, Curiosity, Critical Thinking, Communication, Collaboration and Community. The grades split into three categories which is the first program, Middle school, and the High school. The students who are grade 1 to 8 and have Korean nationalities are required to take a Korean language course. They have two house teachers in one class and the students have the opportunity to go to the University in Korea if they fill the 102 hours of studying Korean History and Korean. Every class is operated by about 70 minutes, with a 5 minute transition time. Also, the students from the school are mandated to do service works. In addition, they take foreign languages, Spanish or Chinese, just for the middle and high school students.

Extracurricular activities 

At the end of every Wednesday and Friday, there are clubs such as Fencing Club, Horseback Riding Club, and Film Club where students can attend. In addition, the school provides sport activities such as basketball, soccer and swimming. The education of the school in the musical area is developed by the middle and high school orchestra. In addition, the school provides service learning projects. The school also offers the Winter school program for the elementary and the middle school students. After school programs(known as ASPs) include Drama Club, swimming, dancing, and horseback riding.

Admission 
The middle and high school students who want to attend the school need to take Math and English tests. However, the elementary students only need a document and an interview for admission. As a condition of attending the school, a student is required to have at least one parent who holds a foreign passport, or the student must have been out of the country of Korea for more than 1,095 days at the time of enrollment.

College acceptance 

The students from Cheongna Dalton school got 60% of a college acceptance from the foreign Universities. However, there were students who got enrolled to the Korean University and the students had an early graduation. Also the half of the students wanted to go to the Korean university when they graduated from the high school.

American Universities & Other Universities:
 Cornell University
 University of Wisconsin, Madison
 New York University
 Massachusetts College of Pharmacy and Health Science 
 George Mason University
 Saint Andrew's University
 Michigan State University
 Emory University
 Washington University
 University of Virginia
 University of the Arts 
 University of Iowa
 University of Southern California
 Les Roches International School of Hotel Management (Switzerland)
 Waseda University (Japan)
And others

Korean Universities:
Seoul National University
Yonsei University
Korea University
Kyunghee University
Hanyang University
Kookmin University
And others

References 

 "Admission." Cheongna Dalton School. Cheongna Dalton School, 2012. Web. 14 Mar. 2016.
 Cheongna Dalton. April 2011.Twitter.Web. 15 March 2016.
 Cheongna Dalton School. Cheongna Dalton School campus. 22 December 2009. Daltonschool.kr. Web. 14 March 2016.
 Cheongna Dalton School. Cheongna School have an experience for studying abroad. 20 October 2011. Daltonschool.kr. Web. 14 March 2016.
 "Cheongna Dalton School." YouTube. Pic CDS, 15 Oct. 2014. Web. 5 Mar. 2016.
 "Location." Cheongna Dalton School. Cheongna Dalton School, 2012. Web. 14 Mar. 2016.
 Shin, Min Jae. "Cheongna Dalton School First Graduates 67% for Foreign Pathways." Yonhapnews. Yonhapnews, 2 Oct. 2015. Web. 5 Mar. 2016.
 Yu, SI Jeong. "아무도 가르쳐주지 않는 국제학교 · 외국인학교의 모든 것." Google Books. Denstory, 25 Nov. 2013. Web. 05 Mar. 2016.
 "청라달튼 외국인 학교 pt1." YouTube. Kangmin Park, 6 Sept. 2010. Web. 05 Mar. 2016.

External links 

 Cheongna Dalton School - Tuition
 Western Association of Schools and Colleges

Boarding schools in South Korea
International schools in South Korea
Schools in Incheon
Educational institutions established in 2011
2011 establishments in South Korea